Skala may refer to:

Places

Greece 
 Skala, Patmos, the main port on the island of Patmos in Greece
 Skala, Laconia, a municipality in southern Greece
 Skala, Xanthi, a settlement in north-eastern Greece
 Skala, Cephalonia, a resort in the Ionian Islands

Elsewhere 
 Skała (disambiguation), several places in Poland
 Skala-Podilska, a town in Ukraine
 Skala, Burgas Province, a village in Burgas Province, south-eastern Bulgaria
 , a village in Dulovo Municipality, Silistra Province, north-eastern Bulgaria
 Skála, a village in the Faroe Islands
 Skåla (disambiguation), places in Norway

Other uses
 SKALA, the process computer for the Chernobyl-type nuclear power plants
 Skala (surname)
 Skala (sports organization), a Jewish Communist sports organization in interbellum Poland
 Skala, a 2011 album by Mathias Eick
 Zastava Skala, a subcompact car made by Serbian manufacturer Zastava

See also
 
 Scala (disambiguation)